Cotinis fuscopicea is a species of Cotinis. It is indigenous to Mexico and Guatemala.

References

Cetoniinae
Beetles of North America
Beetles described in 1966